Heads Up is an album by saxophonist David Newman recorded in New York City in 1986 and released on the Atlantic label.

Reception

In his review for AllMusic, Scott Yanow stated: "Although often placed in more tightly arranged settings throughout his career, Newman really excels in a small-group format, where his soulful tones and expertise at jamming over common chord changes are best displayed. This was one of his better sets, even though the album is not very well known".

Track listing 
 "Ain't Misbehavin'" (Fats Waller, Andy Razaf) – 7:40
 "Makin' Whoopee" (Walter Donaldson, Gus Kahn) – 8:24
 "Heads Up" (David Newman) – 6:21
 "Old Folks" (Willard Robison, Dedette Lee Hill) – 8:12
 "Delilah" (Clifford Brown) – 7:22
 "Lover Man" (Jimmy Davis, Ram Ramirez, James Sherman) – 9:52
 "For Buster" (Newman) – 6:47
 "New York State of Mind" (Billy Joel) – 8:26 Additional track on CD release

Personnel 
David Newman – tenor saxophone, flute
Steve Nelson – vibraphone
Kirk Lightsey – piano
David Williams - bass
Eddie Gladden – drums

References 

David "Fathead" Newman albums
1987 albums
Atlantic Records albums